Ehrendorferia chrysantha (syn. Dicentra chrysantha), with the common name golden eardrops, is a biennial to perennial plant in the family Papaveraceae.

It is native to dry, brushy areas prone to wildfire in diverse regions of California, and in Baja California.

Description
Dicentra chrysantha has a taproot. Its leaves are blue-green, with many lobed leaflets.

Flowers are yellow and aromatic, with the tips of two outer petals curved outward from two central petals, borne in panicles at the top of branched stems 1.5 m tall.

Seeds are borne in a capsule 1–2 cm long. They usually do not germinate unless exposed to fire.

References

External links
Jepson Manual Treatment: Dicentra chrysantha

Fumarioideae
Flora of California
Flora of Baja California

Flora of the Klamath Mountains
Flora of the Sierra Nevada (United States)
Natural history of the California Coast Ranges
Natural history of the Peninsular Ranges
Natural history of the Santa Monica Mountains
Flora without expected TNC conservation status